is a Japanese ice hockey player and member of the Japanese national team, currently playing in the Swedish Women's Hockey League (SDHL) with Linköping HC Dam. She previously served as captain of the Seibu Princess Rabbits of the Women's Japan Ice Hockey League (WJIHL) and All-Japan Women's Ice Hockey Championship.

International play 
Toko's first foray into international competition was as a member of the Japanese national under-18 ice hockey team at the 2010 IIHF Women's World U18 Championship, where she notched three assists in five games. At the 2011 IIHF Women's World U18 Championship, she served as an alternate captain and scored her first world championship goal. 

Toko made her debut with the senior Japanese national ice hockey team in February 2013 at the final qualification for the women's ice hockey tournament at the 2014 Winter Olympics. Later that same year, she participated in the 2013 IIHF Women's World Championship Division I. 

She participated at the 2015 IIHF Women's World Championship. She competed at both the 2014 and the 2018 Winter Olympics.

Personal life 
Her father, Yasunori, represented Japan at the 1991 Men's Ice Hockey World Championship – Group B in Yugoslavia. Her younger siblings are also ice hockey players. Her younger sister, Haruka (born 1997), is a two-time Olympian with the Japanese national ice hockey team and, as of the 2022–23 season, also plays with Linköping HC in the SDHL. Her younger brother, Yutaka (born 2003), has represented Japan with the Japan men's national junior ice hockey team and in the men's ice hockey tournament at the 2023 Winter World University Games.

After graduating from Hosei University in 2016, Toko joined All Nippon Airways through the Top Athlete Employment Support Navigation (AthNavi) program of the Japanese Olympic Committee.

Toko married ice hockey forward  in June 2022. The 2022 IIHF Women's World Championship was her first major tournament played using her married name.

References

External links
 
 
 
 

1994 births
Living people
Asian Games gold medalists for Japan
Asian Games medalists in ice hockey
Competitors at the 2015 Winter Universiade
Ice hockey players at the 2014 Winter Olympics
Ice hockey players at the 2017 Asian Winter Games
Ice hockey players at the 2018 Winter Olympics
Ice hockey players at the 2022 Winter Olympics
Japanese women's ice hockey defencemen
Medalists at the 2017 Asian Winter Games
Olympic ice hockey players of Japan
Sportspeople from Hokkaido
Universiade medalists in ice hockey
Universiade bronze medalists for Japan